Guy Van Den Steen (24 August 1906 – 20 December 1999) was a Belgian sculptor. His work was part of the sculpture event in the art competition at the 1948 Summer Olympics. In 1948, he married Lady Moyra Butler (1920 – 26 May 1959; known at the time as Lady Moyra Weld-Forester), daughter of British peer George Butler, 5th Marquess of Ormonde, in Chelsea, London.

On 19 December 1947, Charles Weld-Forester sued Lady Moyra for divorce, on the basis that she had committed adultery with Guy van den Steen 'on the continent last summer'. Lady Moyra did not defend the suit, and a decree nisi was granted with costs against Count Guy van den Steen. On 3 August 1948 Guy and Lady Moyra were married in Chelsea, London. Their only son Gerard was born in London on 10 October 1949. Lady Moyra died in 1959.

Restoration of the Chateau de Jehay 

In the 1940's, Count Guy van den Steen inherited his family's ancestral home, the Chateau de Jehay. He reported that it was a 'dark, empty shell, surrounded by flat, uncultivated fields' at the time he came into possession of the Chateau. Lady Moyra and Count Guy moved into the Castle in 1950, and worked to restore the Chateau, and many Ormonde heirlooms can be found in the Chateau today.

References

External links
 

1906 births
1999 deaths
20th-century Belgian sculptors
20th-century male artists
Belgian sculptors
Olympic competitors in art competitions